Bian Lan (born August 17, 1984) is a retired Chinese basketball player. She competed in the 2004 Summer Olympics, the 2006 FIBA World Championship for Women and the 2008 Summer Olympics. In the FIBA Asia Championship for Women 2009, Bian helped China to win the tournament, she averaged 10.1 pts, 3.1 rebounds, and 3.7 assists per game and was named the MVP of the tournament.

References

1984 births
Living people
Basketball players at the 2004 Summer Olympics
Basketball players at the 2008 Summer Olympics
Olympic basketball players of China
People from Yixing
Sportspeople from Wuxi
Small forwards
Basketball players from Jiangsu
Chinese women's basketball players
Asian Games medalists in basketball
Basketball players at the 2006 Asian Games
Basketball players at the 2010 Asian Games
Asian Games gold medalists for China
Medalists at the 2006 Asian Games
Medalists at the 2010 Asian Games
Jiangsu Phoenix players